Alexia Dechaume and Florencia Labat were the defending champions, but Dechaume chose to compete at Hamburg during the same week, reaching the quarterfinals. Labat teamed up with Veronika Martinek and lost in the first round to Nathalie Baudone and Cristina Salvi.

Amanda Coetzer and Inés Gorrochategui won the title by defeating Rachel McQuillan and Radka Zrubáková 4–6, 6–3, 7–3(7–0) in the final.

Seeds

Draw

Draw

References

External links
 Official results archive (ITF)
 Official results archive (WTA)

Ilva Trophy
1992 WTA Tour